Zak Willis (born December 30, 1967) is a former American football coach.  He  Willis served as the head football coach at Pikeville College—now the University of Pikeville—from 2000 to 2002, at Newberry College from 2003 to 2008, and at Union College in Barbourville, Kentucky, from 2014 to 2016.

Coaching career
Willis was the first head football coach at Pikeville College in Pikeville, Kentucky.  He held that position for three seasons, from 2000 until 2002.  His coaching record at Pikeville was 16–12.

In December 2002, Willis was named head coach at Newberry College in Newberry, South Carolina. While at Newberry he helped engineer one of the biggest turnarounds in college football. Willis's teams won the only two South Atlantic Conference championships in Newberry's history (2006, 2008 co-champions). During this time period, Newberry also emerged as a leader academically, posting the highest team GPA for any college football team in the South Atlantic Conference (2006, 2007). Willis's teams were also ranked in the top 25 in the nation for 29 consecutive weeks between 2006 and 2008. They posted a 15-game home win streak and an overall home record of 20–1 over the last three seasons of his tenure. Willis's overall record at Newberry College was 39–25 (.609), giving him the highest win percentage in Newberry football history. In Willis's nine-year career as a head coach he coached 69 all-conference performers, 40 All-Region players, and 16 All-Americans. Willis was fired from Newberry shortly after the 2009 spring game. 

In 2009, Willis joined the staff at Michigan State University as a graduate assistant, working with the offensive line and in recruiting. Even though Willis went to Division 1A from D2, the graduate assistant position was considered a big step down; graduate assistants are usually reserved for students just graduating, hence the name. In 2010, the Spartans won their first Big Ten Conference championship in 20 years, and participated in the 2011 Capital One Bowl.  In 2011, Willis was hired by Don Treadwell as recruiting coordinator and special teams coordinator at Miami University in Oxford, Ohio. His 2011 kickoff team led the nation in kickoff return yards allowed. The Miami recruiting class of 2012, under Willis's coordination, was ranked number one in the Mid-American Conference, a first since 2007.

In April 2014, Willis was introduced as the new head coach at Union College in Barbourville, Kentucky. That fall the Bulldogs went 1–9. Another 1-9 season in 2015.

Personal life
Willis resides in Barbourville with his wife and three children.

Head coaching record

Notes

References

1967 births
Living people
Greenville Panthers football coaches
Miami RedHawks football coaches
Michigan State Spartans football coaches
Newberry Wolves football coaches
Pikeville Bears football coaches
South Carolina Gamecocks football coaches
Union (Kentucky) Bulldogs football coaches
Michigan State University alumni
People from Laurinburg, North Carolina